Pope Benedict XVI beatified 870 people. The names listed below are from the Vatican website and are listed by year, then date. The locations given are the locations of the beatification ceremonies, not necessarily the birthplaces or homelands of the beatified.

2005

2006

2007

2008

2009

2010

2011

2012

Notes

 Later canonized on 21 October 2012.
 Later canonized on 27 April 2014.
 Later canonized on 23 November 2014.
 Later canonized on 17 May 2015.
 Later canonized on 18 October 2015.
 Later canonized on 5 June 2016.
 Later canonized on 16 October 2016.
 Later canonized on 13 October 2019.
 Later canonized on 15 May 2022.

See also
 List of people beatified by Pope John XXIII
 List of people beatified by Pope Paul VI
 List of people beatified by Pope John Paul II
 List of people beatified by Pope Francis

Beatified under Pope Benedict XVI
Benedict XVI